Corapi is an Italian surname. Notable people with the surname include:

Francesco Corapi (born 1985), Italian footballer
John Corapi (born 1947), American Roman Catholic priest

Italian-language surnames